Om Sakthi is a 1982 Indian Tamil-language drama film, directed by S. A. Chandrasekhar, starring Vijayakanth and Menaka. Vijayakanth play the negative role and Jaishankar acted as a special appearance.

Cast 
Vijayakanth as Kathavarayan
Menaka as Kanniamma / Amman
R. Dilip
Jaishankar
Nalini as Anandhi

Soundtrack 
The music was composed by Shankar–Ganesh.

References 

1982 films
1980s Tamil-language films
Films scored by Shankar–Ganesh